The University of Mindanao Broadcasting Network (UMBN) is a Philippine radio network majority-owned and controlled by the Torres family. It serves as the media arm of the University of Mindanao. Its headquarters are located at the UMBN Media Center, C. Bangoy St. cor. Palma Gil St., Poblacion, Davao City, while its national marketing offices are located in Makati. UMBN and its subsidiary Mt. Apo Broadcasting System run AM and FM stations in Mindanao, while its other subsidiary Ditan Communications runs the Visayas FM stations. It has three radio network brands, namely UMBN News & Public Affairs, Wild FM and Retro.

History
The origins of UMBN can be traced to DXMC, the first radio station in Davao City and the entire Mindanao region. DXMC was founded in 1949 by businessman Atty. Guillermo E. Torres, and was granted a broadcast franchise by the Congress under Republic Act 514.

The broadcast franchise was later amended on June 22, 1957, under Republic Act 1832, allowing Torres to establish and operate radio stations in the Philippines. With this, the University of Mindanao Broadcasting Network or UMBN was established on the same year the MC was renamed as the University of Mindanao. DXUM was also launched as its second radio station in Davao.

From 1957 to the 1960s, UMBN established several stations within the Mindanao area such as in the Davao areas (DXMM in Davao City, DXDN in Tagum, and DXDS in Digos), Cotabato City, General Santos, Cagayan de Oro, Zamboanga City, Iligan, and Bukidnon.

In 1972, all UMBN stations were shut down in the midst of the Martial Law, but later resumed its operations lately. In 1975, Torres transferred the ownership of DXUM to Mt. Apo Broadcasting System (also owned by Torres) but maintaining its airtime operations.

In 1988, about two years after the "EDSA People Power Revolution", DXMC was transferred to the FM broadcasting frequency and relaunched as DXWT, forming the nucleus of UMBN's FM network known as Wild FM, while DXUM and other AM stations formed the nucleus of the Radyo Ukay network.

In the 1990s, UMBN expanded its Wild FM network into the Visayas region with launch of 105.9 Wild FM Cebu in 1994 through airtime lease. This was later transferred to 103.5 MHz in 2000 after Ditan Communications became an affiliate of UMBN.

In the 2000s, UMBN rented the airtime of Rajah Broadcasting Network-owned DXDJ and became known as an oldies/classic hits station Hit Radio 100.3. Its programming format would later move to DXKR 95.5 via airtime lease from ACWS-UBN in 2010. The station later became known as Retro 95.5.

On June 16, 2020, its AM stations retired the Radyo Ukay branding after 20 years, as part of enhancement of the stations' news and public affairs programming.

Radio networks

AM Stations

Wild FM

Retro

Former stations

References

Mass media companies of the Philippines
Philippine radio networks
Radio stations in the Philippines
Mass media companies established in 1950
Companies based in Davao City
1950 establishments in the Philippines
Privately held companies